von der Esch is a surname of German origin. Notable people with the surname include:

Cecilia von der Esch (born 1985), Swedish actress and comedian
Björn von der Esch (1930–2010), Swedish politician
Hansjoachim von der Esch (1899–1976), German explorer and ambassador

See also
Leighton Vander Esch, American football player
Esch (surname)

German-language surnames